HVDC Leyte–Luzon is a high-voltage direct current transmission link in the Philippines between geothermal power plants on the islands of Leyte and Luzon.

History
The feasibility study of the transmission project was conducted by the Japan International Cooperation Agency in 1981. The project financing was approved by World Bank in June 1994, co-financed also by the Japan Export-Import Bank. The HVDC Leyte–Luzon went in service on August 10, 1998. It is operated by the privately-owned National Grid Corporation of the Philippines (NGCP) since January 15, 2009, and previously by government-owned companies National Transmission Corporation (TransCo) and National Power Corporation (NAPOCOR). It was owned previously by NAPOCOR from August 10, 1998, to March 1, 2003, and is owned currently by TransCo since March 1, 2003.

Technical description
Capacity of the Leyte-Luzon is a 440 MW. It is implemented as monopolar line for a voltage of 350 kV, feeding the power grid in the Manila region. In addition to overall connection of grids, HVDC was chosen to enable supply of bulk geothermal power, and to stabilize the alternating current network in Manila region. The interconnector was manufactured by the ABB Group in cooperation with Marubeni Corporation.

The crossing of San Juanico Strait is realized as overhead crossing with a tower on an island in the strait.

Route  
The HVDC Leyte–Luzon begins at Ormoc converter station (Leyte) and ends at Naga converter station (Camarines Sur). It consists three sections: 
 Leyte-Samar overhead line
 submarine cables across San Bernardino Strait between Cabacungan (Allen, Samar) and Santa Magdalena (Sorsogon, Luzon)
 overhead line at Luzon

They are connected with the converter stations by 25 respectively 15-kilometre-long overhead lines.

References

External links 

 Leyte – Luzon HVDC Transmission line and tower photo

Submarine power cables
HVDC transmission lines
Energy infrastructure completed in 1998
Transmission lines in the Philippines
1998 establishments in the Philippines